Ernesto "Tino" Brambilla (31 January 1934 – 3 August 2020) was a Grand Prix motorcycle road racer and a professional race car driver from Italy. Born in Monza, he was the brother of driver Vittorio Brambilla. In 1959, he finished in 10th place in the 350cc Grand Prix motorcycle season. In 1961 he again finished in 10th place in the 350 class.

Brambilla entered two Formula One Grands Prix, firstly in the 1963 Italian Grand Prix with Scuderia Centro Sud, driving a Cooper, which he failed to qualify.  For the 1969 race he was entered by Ferrari, but the car was ultimately driven by Pedro Rodríguez.

Brambilla died on 3 August 2020 in Monza.

Motorcycle Grand Prix results
Source:

(key) (Races in bold indicate pole position; races in italics indicate fastest lap)

Complete Formula One results
Source:
(key)

References

1934 births
2020 deaths
Sportspeople from Monza
Italian motorcycle racers
Italian racing drivers
Italian Formula One drivers
Scuderia Centro Sud Formula One drivers
Ferrari Formula One drivers
European Formula Two Championship drivers
350cc World Championship riders